Glipa pici is a species of beetle in the genus Glipa. It was described in 1940.

References

pici
Beetles described in 1940